Pathfinder Online was a MMORPG based on the Pathfinder Roleplaying Game. Completion of development is uncertain due to layoffs of most of the development team and no major publishers signed.

Development
A computer game adaptation of the Pathfinder universe, Pathfinder Online, was announced on November 27, 2012 by Goblin Works and Paizo and was successful in attracting Kickstarter crowdfunding in 2013 to finance its development. An official alpha test was announced in late June 2014. Early enrollment was announced on July 29, 2015.

On September 2, 2015, Lisa Stevens, acting CEO of Goblinworks and CEO of Paizo Publishing announced layoffs at Goblinworks of most of the Pathfinder Online development team. As of March 2016, the project was in the process of transitioning to a new developer.

On March 17, 2017, a roadmap for the future development of Pathfinder Online was posted on Goblinworks's blog.

On July 27, 2021, it was announced by Goblin Works that they planned to shut the game down permanently on November 28, 2021 after a big finale. They did however, say that it may not be possible for them to keep the servers running the entire time, citing the age of the servers. They also announced that once it was shut down, there would be a write-up on Paizo's website lays out how it affects Pathfinder's lore as a whole.

References

External links
 Goblin Works - official developer Web site

Cancelled Windows games
Fantasy massively multiplayer online role-playing games
Inactive massively multiplayer online games
Kickstarter-funded video games
Pathfinder
Video games based on tabletop role-playing games